Willie and Family Live is a live album by country music artist Willie Nelson.  It was released in 1978 as a double-LP. It was recorded live at Harrah's in Lake Tahoe, Nevada in April 1978. Emmylou Harris provides backup vocals on "Will the Circle be Unbroken", "Uncloudy Day" and "Amazing Grace"; Johnny Paycheck provides backup vocals on "Amazing Grace" and "Take this Job and Shove It".

Track listing

Side one
 "Whiskey River" – 3:40
 "Stay All Night (Stay a Little Longer)" – 3:24
 "Funny How Time Slips Away" – 2:45
 "Crazy" – 1:47
 "Night Life" – 3:55
 "If You've Got the Money (I've Got the Time)" – 1:44
 "Mammas Don't Let Your Babies Grow Up to Be Cowboys" – 3:33
 "I Can Get Off on You" – 2:06
Side two
 "If You Could Touch Her at All" – 3:00
 "Good Hearted Woman" – 2:57
 "Red Headed Stranger Medley" 14:25
"Time of the Preacher" - 2:13
"I Couldn't Believe It Was True" - 1:03
"Medley: Blue Rock Montana/Red Headed Stranger" - 2:40
"Blue Eyes Crying in the Rain" - 2:29
"Red Headed Stranger" - 4:31
4. "Under the Double Eagle" - 2:43
Side three
 "'Til I Gain Control Again" – 5:59
 "Bloody Mary Morning" – 3:33
 "I'm a Memory" – 1:52
 "Mr. Record Man" – 2:01
 "Hello Walls" – 1:29
 "One Day at a Time" – 2:05
 "Will the Circle Be Unbroken" – 2:18
 "Amazing Grace" – 5:12
Side four
 "Take This Job and Shove It" – 2:52
 "Uncloudy Day" – 3:40
 "Only Daddy That'll Walk the Line" – 1:29
 "A Song for You" – 2:43
 "Roll in My Sweet Baby's Arms" – 1:56
 "Georgia on My Mind" – 4:09
 "I Gotta Get Drunk" – 1:22
 "Whiskey River" – 2:42
 "Only Daddy That'll Walk the Line" – 2:12

Chart performance

Notes

1978 live albums
Willie Nelson live albums
Columbia Records live albums